Jalan Kuala Dungun, or Jalan Haji Zainal Abidin, Federal Route 127,  is a federal road in Terengganu, Malaysia. The Kilometre Zero of the Federal Route 127 starts at Jalan Kuala Terengganu-Paka junctions.

At most sections, the Federal Route 127 was built under the JKR R5 road standard, allowing maximum speed limit of up to 90 km/h.

List of junctions and towns (south-north)

References

Malaysian Federal Roads